Jan Fortune (born November 24, 1926) was an American politician and engineer in the American state of Florida.

Career 
Fortune was born in 1926 in Pennsylvania to Robert J. and Blanch (Rauch) Fortune, of Scottish and Dutch ancestry. He earned a Bachelor of Science degree in industrial management from Pennsylvania State University and a Master of Business Administration from the Wharton School of the University of Pennsylvania.

Career 
Fortune worked for the Westinghouse Air Brake Company in Pennsylvania, Curtiss-Wright in New jersey, A. T. Kearney and Company in Chicago, and the Glenn L. Martin Company in Florida.

He served in the Florida House of Representatives for Seminole County from 1963 to 1965 and 1967 to 1968.

Personal life 
Fortune married Donna Martin of Norwood, New York, in 1953. They have one son, Jan Eric. Fortune served in the United States Army Signal Corps as a lieutenant during the Korean War and with the United States Maritime Service in World War II. He is Protestant.

References

1926 births
Year of death missing
Members of the Florida House of Representatives
Politicians from Pottsville, Pennsylvania
People from Maitland, Florida
Military personnel from Pennsylvania
Penn State College of Engineering alumni
Wharton School of the University of Pennsylvania alumni
20th-century American politicians